Tazeh Kand-e Sabalan (also Romanized as Tāzeh Kand-e Sabalān; also, simply, Tāzeh Kand) is a village in the Sabalan District of Sareyn County, Ardabil Province, Iran. At the 2006 census, its population was 138 in 29 families.

References 

Tageo

Towns and villages in Sareyn County